The Fiji Performing Rights Association (FIPRA) is a Collective Management Organization (CMO) for Copyright in Music. representing South Pacific composers, lyricists and music publishers. The association's head office is located in Suva, Fiji, it is the largest performing rights association in the south pacific and works closely with the Australasian Performing Right Association, with which FIPRA has a Reciprocal Agreement.

History 
In 1993, FPRA was established in Fiji, Under a licence agreement with Australasian Performing Right Association.

FPRA Music Awards 
Every year in the mid, FPRA host its own music awards to honour achievements by south pacific  music artists.

2014 FPRA Music Awards

2015 FPRA Music Awards
 Best Gospel Song: Nikotimo, Artist: Divine Signature Gospel, Composer: Sainitiki Sinumila
 Best New Artist: Seni Dawa ni Delai Dokidoki
 Best Music Video: Vly: Mositi Au
 Most Outstanding Song: Artist: Knox, Composer: Inoke Kalounisiga for the song: “Coming Home”
 Best Recording Engineer: Ravesi Leweniqila for “Na Dodomo e Mataboko”, Artist: Waisale Qilatabu
 Most Popular Song: Track: “Rarawa ni Yalo Oqo”, Artist: Via ni Tebara Serenaders
 Best Hindi Song: “Van Ko Chali Man Janki” Artist: Avinesh Chand, Composer: Avinesh Chand
 Best iTaukei Song: Savuto Vakadewavosa (ft. DJ Ritendra) for Curu Mai
 Best English Song: Coming Home, Artist: Knox 
 International Achievement Award: Knox
 Outstanding Service to Fijian Music: Tui Ravai
 Best Composition: Knox for “Coming Home”
 Hall of Fame: 5 Inductees
 Rev W. E Bennet of the Methodist Church of Fiji, Artist Deceased, Received by the Methodist Church
 Ro Cavaisiga Raicebe, Artist Deceased, Prize received by Mrs Raicebe
 Jolame Rokodrega, Artist Deceased, Prize received by Daughter
 Mr Satvik Dass, Prize received by son
 Mr Amena Wainibu, Artist Deceased, Prize received by Mrs Wainibu

2016 FPRA Music Awards

2017 FPRA Music Awards

2018 FPRA Music Awards

The 2018 FPRA Music Awards was held on the 12th of May at the Grand Pacific Hotel.

See also 
Savuto Vakadewavosa 
Elena Baravilala 
Australasian Performing Right Association - the reciprocal society serving New Zealand and Australia.
Performing Right Society - the reciprocal society serving the United Kingdom.

References

External links 
 FPRA website
 Facebook Page

Music organisations based in Fiji
Music licensing organizations